Lt Gen (R) Muzammil Hussain is a Pakistani army retired officer who served as chairman of WAPDA for five years until his resignation in May 2022. He is also serving as the chairman of the Pakistan Boxing Federation.

Corruption case
In June 2022, The National Accountability Bureau (NAB) claims there are charges against Hussain of abuse of power and misuse of public funds in the extension-IV hydropower project at Tarbela Dam, which resulted in a loss of $753 million. However, he stated personal reasons for his failure to show up before the NAB Lahore. In October 2022, he was summoned again.

References

Year of birth missing (living people)
Pakistan Army officers
Chairman of the Water & Power Development Authority
Living people